is a Japanese football club located in Ōita, Capital of Ōita Prefecture. They currently play in J2 League, Japanese second tier of professional football.

Name origin 

The club's name, Trinita, is the Italian translation of the word trinity (trinità), which was the club's original name before being changed in 1999, and Ōita, the club's home town. The combined word expresses the will of the local citizens, companies, and government to support the team. Another connection to the Italian culture can be found in the city nickname Azzurro ("light blue" in Italian).

History 

The club was formed as Ōita Trinity in 1994 and advanced through the Ōita Prefectural League and the Kyushu League before finishing as the runner-up of the 1996 National League, resulting in promotion to the JFL. In 1999, the club changed its name to Trinita due to copyright infringement concerns. The same year, the club joined J.League Division 2, the second-highest flight in Japanese football (renamed to its current name of J2 League in 2015) and placed third. The club also placed third in 2000, and despite being in contention for promotion until the final game of the season in 2001, finished sixth. The following year, the club won J.League Division 2 and finally earned promotion to the top-flight Division 1. In 2008, the club won the J.League Cup, the first major title won by a Kyūshū club since Yawata Steel SC shared the 1964 Emperor's Cup.

In 2009, the club suffered their worst-ever results in their seven-year history in the topflight, including 14 straight losses in league matches, which is the current worst record in the J.League since the golden goal system was eliminated. The club even fired cup-winning manager Pericles Chamusca in mid-July. On October 25, the club's relegation was confirmed after being held to a 1–1 draw by ten-man Kyoto Sanga F.C., although the club would have faced relegation anyway as they had outstanding loans from the JFL's emergency fund and league rules prohibit clubs with such loans from participating in the top tier.

During the 2012 J.League Division 2 season, Oita Trinita finished in sixth place, qualifying for the promotion playoffs in the first year of its introduction in Japan's second flight as the club had also paid back all its emergency loans that October. Despite being the lowest seed, Oita Trinita defeated Kyoto Sanga F.C. 4–0 in the semi-final and JEF United Ichihara Chiba 1–0 in the final, earning promotion to 2013 J.League Division 1, returning to the top tier after a 5-year absence This time, however, their top tier stay lasted only one season. In 2015 they were further relegated to J3 League after losing in the promotion playoffs to Machida Zelvia on December 6, becoming the first major trophy winner to be relegated to the third tier. The club immediately gained promotion back to J2 League by winning the J3 League title in 2016. In 2018, after finishing as runner's up in the J2 League in 2018, Oita Trinita gained promotion back to J1. After finishing 18th in 2021, Trinita would be relegated back to J2 League, but in the background of that, the club made a Cinderella run to the Emperor's Cup Final. Just 1 week after the confirmation to be relegated, they defeated defending Emperor's Cup champion Kawasaki Frontale in stunning fashion in the semis; after the game was tied 1 all, Trinita won 4–5 on penalty kicks. They ended up losing to Urawa Red Diamonds in the final, giving the Reds their eighth Emperor's Cup title.

The club will play its second consecutive season at the J2 League on 2023.

Location
The club's home town is the city of Ōita, but the club draws support from the entire Ōita Prefecture.

Stadium 
The club's home ground is Resonac Dome Oita, also known as the "Big Eye", which was one of the venues built for the 2002 FIFA World Cup. The club practices at its adjacent football and rugby field, and Ōita City Public Ground.

Record as J.League member 

Key

Honours

League
J2 League
 Champions: 2002
J3 League
 Champions: 2016
Kyushu Soccer League
Champions: 1995

Cups
J.League Cup
 Winners: 2008

Players

Current squad 
 

Type 2
Type 2
Type 2

Out on loan

Club captains
 Cui Daewoo (1999)
 Tomohiro Katanosaka (2000)
 Tetsuro Uki (2002–2003)
 Sandro (2004)
 Takayuki Yoshida (2005)
 Takashi Miki (2006–2007)
 Daiki Takamatsu (2008–2010)
 Masashi Miyazawa (2011–2013)
 Kazumichi Takagi (2014)
 Daniel (2015)
 Satoru Yamagishi (2016–2017)
 Akira Takeuchi (January – August 2018)
 Kenji Baba (August – December 2018)
 Yoshinori Suzuki (2019–2020)
 Shun Takagi (2021)
 Hokuto Shimoda (2022)
 Tsukasa Umesaki (2023–present)

Coaching staff 
For the 2023 J2 League season.

Managerial history

Kit evolution

References

External links
 Official Website 

 
J.League clubs
Football clubs in Japan
Association football clubs established in 1994
Japanese League Cup winners
Sports teams in Ōita Prefecture
1994 establishments in Japan
Japan Football League (1992–1998) clubs